La Roque-d'Anthéron (Provençal: La Ròca d'Antarron) is a commune in the Bouches-du-Rhône department in the Provence-Alpes-Côte d'Azur region in Southern France. Part of the Aix-Marseille-Provence Metropolis, it is located on the departmental border with Vaucluse. In 2018, La Roque-d'Anthéron had a population of 5,441. Silvacane Abbey, a former Cistercian monastery founded in 1144 by monks from Morimond Abbey, is located in La Roque-d'Anthéron, east of the town centre.

History
Cited in 1037 under the name of Roca, the village then had a varying etymology being named La Rocca d'An Tarron (in 1200), Roccha Tarroni (in 1274) and then Rocca d'en Tarron.

Demographics

See also 
 Communes of the Bouches-du-Rhône department
 Festival de La Roque-d'Anthéron

References

Communes of Bouches-du-Rhône
Bouches-du-Rhône communes articles needing translation from French Wikipedia